Yasahpala or Jasapala was the last  king of the Imperial Pratihara dynasty, who ruled from 1024 till 1036 CE. He succeeded his father, Trilochanapala (1018–1027). The Pratihara authority had shrunk considerably only to the city of Kannauj and the surrounding region.

References

Pratihara empire
History of Rajasthan
History of Gujarat
11th-century Indian monarchs